Yahya ibn Mu'adh ibn Muslim was a senior official and governor for the Abbasid Caliphate.

Yahya was the son of the Persian mawla Mu'adh ibn Muslim, a distinguished member of the Khurasaniyya, who served the early Abbasids as governor and general. In 806, Caliph Harun al-Rashid sent Yahya to Syria to suppress the bandit leader Abu al-Nida. Yahya accomplished this task, and served as governor of all of Syria for a year. He then accompanied Harun in his journey to Khurasan to confront the revolt of Rafi ibn al-Layth, and after Harun's death in 809 remained in Khurasan with Harun's second son, al-Ma'mun. When the civil war with al-Amin broke out, he was offered the position of vizier to al-Ma'mun but refused—the post went to al-Fadl ibn Sahl—and remained uninvolved in the conflict. After the end of the civil war he served as governor of the Jazira and of Armenia, and took the field against the Khurramites of Babak Khorramdin. He died in 821/822.

His sons, Ahmad, Ishaq, and Sulayman, also held governorships and senior positions in the caliphal court.

References

Sources  

 

8th-century births
820s deaths
Generals of the Abbasid Caliphate
Governors of the Abbasid Caliphate
Syria under the Abbasid Caliphate
9th-century Iranian people
Abbasid governors of Arminiya